Ab Barik-e Vosta (also Romanized as Āb Bārīk-e Vosţá; also known as Āb Bārīk-e Vasaţ) is a village in Ab Barik Rural District, in the Central District of Sonqor County, Kermanshah Province, Iran. At the 2006 census, its population was 29, in 8 families.

References 

Populated places in Sonqor County